Ivan Mathias Gunnar Petersson (born 5 October 1971) is a Swedish actor, film director, author and screenwriter born in Spånga, Stockholm Municipality. His father is actor Bo-Ivan Petersson.

Selected filmography
1995 – Nattens barn (TV)
1997 – 9 millimeter
1999 - C/O Segemyhr (TV series(S03E10 Konnässören))
2000 – 
2001 – Pusselbitar (TV)
2001 – Rendezvous (also screenwriter and director)
2002 – Hjälp! Rånare! (TV)
2002 – Tusenbröder (TV)
2003 – Lillebror på tjuvjakt
2005 – Den utvalde
2006 – Mäklarna (TV)
2006 – Möbelhandlarens dotter (TV)
2006 – Tjocktjuven
2007 – Järnets änglar
2007 – Leende guldbruna ögon (TV)
2007 – Beck – Det tysta skriket
2008 – Maria Wern – Främmande fågel (TV)
2009 – Wallander – Skytten
2019 – Treadstone

Bibliography
2000 – Mataffärens hemlighet

References

External links

1971 births
Swedish-language writers
Swedish screenwriters
Swedish male screenwriters
Swedish film directors
Living people
Male actors from Stockholm